Donchenko is a Russian and Ukrainian surname. Notable people with the surname include:

Alexander Donchenko (born 1998), Russian-German chess grandmaster
Natalya Donchenko (born 1932), Russian speed skater

See also
 

Russian-language surnames
Ukrainian-language surnames